Ban Plak Raet Halt is a railway halt located in Tha Chao Sanuk Subdistrict, Tha Ruea District, Phra Nakhon Si Ayutthaya.

Train services 
 Ordinary No. 208 Nakhon Sawan- Bangkok
 Ordinary No. 209/210 Bangkok- Ban Takhli- Bangkok
 Commuter No. 301/302 Bangkok- Lop Buri- Bangkok (weekends only)
 Commuter No. 303/304 Bangkok- Lop Buri- Bangkok (weekdays only)
 Commuter No. 315 Bangkok- Lop Buri (weekdays only)
 Commuter No. 318 Lop Buri- Bangkok (weekdays only)
 Local No. 409 Ayutthaya- Lop Buri

References 
 
 

Railway stations in Thailand